Mooring is an unincorporated community in Brazos County, in the U.S. state of Texas. According to the Handbook of Texas, the community had a population of 80 in 2000. It is located within the Bryan-College Station metropolitan area.

History
Mooring first appeared on the Texas Almanac in 1954 or 55 but had no population estimates available. It had a church, a business, and several scattered homes in 1948. Its population was recorded at 150 in 1964, 100 in 1970, and 80 from 1973 through 2000. Its only business was a cotton gin in 1990.

Geography
Mooring is located at the intersection of Farm to Market Road 50 and Texas State Highway 21 on the Southern Pacific Railroad in far northwestern Brazos County.

Education
Mooring had its own school in 1948. Today, the community is served by the Bryan Independent School District.

References

Unincorporated communities in Brazos County, Texas
Unincorporated communities in Texas